Cornelius Sneek (1455-1534) was a 15th-16th century Dominican priest and a member of the Congregation of Holland.

He was a student of Alanus de Rupe and wrote one of the early works on the rosary. Sneek taught the Summa Theologica at Rostock.

References

Literature 
  
 Gerhard Schlegel: Sneek, Cornelius Henrici von, in: Sabine Pettke (Hg.): Biographisches Lexikon für Mecklenburg.  Vol. 2, Rostock: Schmidt-Römhild 1999 (publication of the Historic Commission for Mecklenburg) , pp. 238–242
 

Dutch Dominicans
1455 births
1534 deaths